Ringworm is an American metallic hardcore band formed in Cleveland, Ohio in 1989. Their name was derived from a Vincent Price movie. The band has toured extensively in the United States, Australia, New Zealand, and Europe and has released four albums via Victory Records. In 2013, the band announced they had signed with Relapse Records and that their next album would be released through them. Vocalist Human Furnace currently plays in the Cleveland metal band Gluttons and solo project Holyghost.

Musical style
According to frontman Human Furnace, while being interviewed by Davin Deblat in 2019 he mentions the band's sound and style as well as their association in both the metal and hardcore scene:

"If you look at the songs that we play, and what we're about, 70–80 percent of our songs are mostly just thrash. Very fast, very thrashy, and then you got some breakdowns. When you play a hardcore gig, everyone just stares at you for your whole set and they just wait for that one riff so they can spin around in circles and crowd-kill. And I'm not really about that. So when you play a metal show and you play thrash riffs and headbanging riffs, then metalheads respond to that and it's a fun thing. I definitely relate more to that scene because that's what I am. I grew up a punk rock kid, a metal kid, so I have a lot more in common with that scene… these days, anyway."

Members

Current
 James "Human Furnace" Bulloch – vocals
 Matt Sorg – guitar
 Mike Lare – guitar
 Ed Stephens – bass

Former 
 John Comprix – guitar
 Mike Lare – bass, vocals
 Matt Devries – guitar
 Frank Novinec – guitar
 Chris Pellow – bass
 Blaze Tishko – guitar, bass
 John "Lockjaw" Tole – bass
 Chris Smith – guitar
 Kenny Carpenter – drums
 Bob Zeiger – drums
 Aaron Ramirez – bass
 Aaron Dallison – guitar
 Steve Rauckhorst – bass
 Ben Hollowell – bass
 Chris Dora – drums
 Danny Zink – drums
 Ryan Steigerwald – drums

Discography
 1991: Ringworm (self-released demo), later released by Overkill Records
 1993: The Promise (Incision Records), later reissued on CD by Deathwish Inc and vinyl by A389 Recordings
 1994: Split 7" with Boiling Point (Lost and Found Records)
 1995: Flatline (demo from 1991 which became bonus tracks on subsequent re-release of The Promise) (Lost and Found Records)
 1999: Madness of War (self-released demo)
 2000: Hollow Soul (split with Godbelow) (Surface Records)
 2001: Split 7" with Cold as Life (Stillborn Records)
 2001: Birth is Pain (Victory Records)
 2003: Splitseveninch (split with Terror) (Deathwish Inc.)
 2005: Justice Replaced by Revenge (Victory Records)
 2007: The Venomous Grand Design (Victory Records)
 2011: Scars (Victory Records)
 2011: Your Soul Belongs to Us... (split with Mindsnare) (A389 Recordings)
 2012: Stigmatas in the Flesh (live album) (A389 Recordings)
 2013: Bleed (EP) (Relapse Records)
 2014: Hammer of the Witch (Relapse Records)
 2016: Snake Church (Relapse Records)
 2019: Death Becomes My Voice (Relapse Records)

Videography
 "Justice Replaced by Revenge" (2005)
 "The Ninth Circle" (2007)
 "Used Up, Spit Out" (2011)
 "Snake Church" (2016)
 "Shades of Blue" (2016)

References

External links
 Official website
 MySpace page

Hardcore punk groups from Ohio
Heavy metal musical groups from Ohio
Metalcore musical groups from Ohio
American thrash metal musical groups
Musical groups from Cleveland
1989 establishments in Ohio
Musical groups established in 1989
Victory Records artists
Deathwish Inc. artists
Musical quintets